Stéphanie Falzon (born 7 January 1983 in Bordeaux, France) is a female hammer thrower from France.

She competed in major international competitions such as the Olympic Games, the World Championships, and the European Championships.

Her personal best is 73.40 metres, which she achieved at the French Athletics Championships on 26 July 2008 in Albi and in June 2010 in Montreuil-sous-Bois.

Results in international competitions
Note: Only the position and distance in the final are indicated, unless otherwise stated. If the athlete did not qualify for the final, the overall position and distance in the qualification round are indicated.

References

Stéphanie Falzon at sports-reference

1983 births
Living people
French female hammer throwers
Athletes (track and field) at the 2008 Summer Olympics
Athletes (track and field) at the 2012 Summer Olympics
Olympic athletes of France
Sportspeople from Bordeaux
World Athletics Championships athletes for France
21st-century French women